Bagnell may refer to:

Places
Bagnell, Missouri, US
Bagnell Dam
Bagnell Ferry, Oregon, US

People
Edgar Wirt Bagnell (1890–1958), American aviator
Francis J. "Reds" Bagnell (1928–1995), American football player
Glen M. Bagnell (born ]1936), Canadian politician
John Bagnell Bury (1861–1927), Anglo-Irish historian and scholar
Larry Bagnell, Canadian politician

See also
 Bagnall (disambiguation)
 Bignell (disambiguation)